Live at Yoshi's is a live album by jazz guitarist Joe Pass that was released in 1992.

Reception

Writing for Allmusic, music critic Les Line said of the album: "It's one of the best of the many Joe Pass albums."

Track listing
 "Doxy" (Sonny Rollins) – 6:00
 "The Breeze and I" (Ernesto Lecuona, Al Stillman) – 4:23
 "Blues for Monty" (Joe Pass) – 6:25
 "You Were Meant for Me" (John Pisano) – 6:22
 "Swingin' Till the Girls Come Home" (Oscar Pettiford) – 4:40
 "I Thought About You" (Johnny Mercer, Jimmy Van Heusen) – 4:36
 "Alone Together" (Howard Dietz, Arthur Schwartz) – 5:59
 "Good Bait" (Count Basie, Tadd Dameron) – 5:16
 "Oleo" (Rollins) – 5:32
 "The Song Is You" (Oscar Hammerstein II, Jerome Kern) – 6:20

Personnel
 Joe Pass – guitar
 John Pisano – guitar
 Monty Budwig – bass
Colin Bailey – drums

References

Joe Pass live albums
1993 live albums
Pablo Records live albums